Tajabad (also Romanized as Tājābād) is a village in Bezenjan Rural District, in the Central District of Baft County, Kerman Province, Iran. At the 2006 census, its population was 275, in 63 families.

References 

Populated places in Baft County